Joyce Ababio (born in 1960) is a Ghanaian fashion designer. She is the founder and CEO of JACCD Design Institute Africa.

Education 
Joyce Ababio attended Achimota School. After her secondary education, she got an admission into St. Cloud State University in Minnesota, USA. However, after a year studying Medical Technology, she spoke with her advisors and was then transferred to Texas Woman's University where she obtained her degree in Fashion Designing.

In 2013, she launched her eponymous school called Joyce Ababio College of Creative Design (JACCD) in Accra, Ghana.

Awards and recognitions 
Some of her achievements include:

 Best Formal Evening Wear Award, Miss World (1995)
 Ebony Award for Bridal and Pageantry (1999)
 Best Evening Wear, Miss Ghana (2000)
 Fashion Contributor Award in Education and Mentoring
 Ghana Fashion Awards (2012)
 Life Time Achievement Award, Glitz Africa Fashion Week (2013)

See also 
 Kofi Ansah

References 

Living people
Ghanaian fashion designers
Ghanaian women fashion designers
Alumni of Achimota School
People from Accra
St. Cloud State University alumni
Texas Woman's University alumni
1988 births